Milling is a surname. Notable people with this name include:

 Amanda Milling (born 1975), British politician
 Henry Milling (died 1822), British Army officer
 Hugh Milling (1962–2003), Irish cricketer
 James Milling  (born 1965), American football player
 Kara Milling (born 1976), American volleyball player
 Stephen Milling, Danish operatic bass singer
 Thomas D. Milling (1887–1960), pioneer of military aviation and a brigadier general in the U.S. Army Air Corps
Sharon Milling (born 1974,
Children's Author of 'Mum, I Want To Pee'. Ex-Tv Presenter for BBC.

See also
Michael Crowley-Milling (1917–2012), Welsh engineer